John W. Brown was a set decorator. He won an Oscar in the category Best Art Direction for the film Camelot.

Selected filmography
 Camelot (1967)

References

External links

Set decorators
Best Art Direction Academy Award winners
Year of birth missing
Possibly living people